Ertis (Ertıs) is a selo in northern Kazakhstan. It is the administrative center of Ertis District in Pavlodar Region. Population: . It is situated on the left bank of the Irtysh River.

Climate

References

Populated places in Pavlodar Region
Populated places on the Irtysh River